Ronaldo José Hernández (born November 11, 1997) is a Colombian professional baseball catcher in the Boston Red Sox organization.

Career

Tampa Bay Rays 
Hernández signed with the Tampa Bay Rays as an international free agent in August 2014. He made his professional debut in 2015 with the Dominican Summer League Rays, recording a .227 batting average in 13 games. He played 2016 with the Dominican Summer League Rays, slashing .340/.406/.485 with 6 home runs and 35 runs batted in (RBIs) in 54 games, and 2017 with the Princeton Rays, hitting .332 with 5 home runs and 40 RBIs in 54 games.

Hernández played 2018 with the Bowling Green Hot Rods where he slashed .284/.339/.494 with 21 home runs and 79 RBIs in 109 games. After the season, he played in the Arizona Fall League for the Peoria Javelinas. He spent 2019 with the Charlotte Stone Crabs, slashing .265/.299/.397 with 9 home runs and 60 RBI in 103 games. Hernández was named to the 2019 All-Star Futures Game. He played for the Salt River Rafters in the Arizona Fall League following the 2019 season.

Hernández was added to the Rays 40-man roster following the 2019 season, and did not play during 2020 as the minor league season was canceled.

Boston Red Sox 
On February 17, 2021, the Rays traded Hernández and Nick Sogard to the Boston Red Sox in exchange for Chris Mazza and Jeffrey Springs. Hernández began the 2021 season in Double-A with the Portland Sea Dogs and was promoted late in the season to the Triple-A Worcester Red Sox; in 99 total games, be batted a combined .284 with 16 home runs and 58 RBIs.

Hernández began the 2022 season with Worcester. He was selected to Boston's active roster on April 19, after both Christian Vázquez and Kevin Plawecki were placed on the COVID-related list, then returned to Worcester the following day, when Vázquez was reactivated. The Red Sox again added Hernández to their major-league roster for one game, on August 1, following the trade of Vázquez and prior to catcher Reese McGuire joining the team. Hernández spending time on Boston's active roster without yet appearing in a major-league game made him an example of a phantom ballplayer. He was assigned outright to Worcester, thus removed from the 40-man roster, on December 2, 2022.

References

External links

SoxProspects scouting report

Living people
1997 births
Major League Baseball players from Colombia
Major League Baseball catchers
Bowling Green Hot Rods players
Dominican Summer League Rays players
Peoria Javelinas players
Portland Sea Dogs players
Princeton Rays players
Salt River Rafters players
Toros del Este players
Worcester Red Sox players